ECASD may refer to:
 Ellwood City Area School District (Pennsylvania)
Eau Claire Area School District (Wisconsin)